The Colonial Revival architectural style seeks to revive elements of American colonial architecture.

The beginnings of the Colonial Revival style are often attributed to the Centennial Exhibition of 1876, which reawakened Americans to the architectural traditions of their colonial past. Fairly small numbers of Colonial Revival homes were built c. 1880–1910, a period when Queen Anne-style architecture was dominant in the United States. From 1910–1930, the Colonial Revival movement was  ascendant, with about 40% of U.S. homes built during this period in the Colonial Revival style. In the immediate post-war period (c. 1950s–early 1960s), Colonial Revival homes continued to be constructed, but in simplified form. In the present-day, many New Traditional homes draw from Colonial Revival styles.

While the dominant influences in Colonial Revival style are Georgian and Federal architecture, Colonial Revival homes also draw, to a lesser extent, from the Dutch Colonial style and post-medieval English styles. Colonial Revival homes are often eclectic in style, freely combining aspects from several of these prototypes.

Although associated with the architectural movement, "Colonial Revival" also refers to historic preservation, landscape architecture and garden design, and decorative arts movements that emulate or draw inspiration from colonial forms.

Cyril M. Harris's American Architecture: An Illustrated Encyclopedia noted that "Colonial Revival houses are usually the result of a rather free interpretation of their prototypes; they tend to be larger, may differ significantly from the houses they seek to emulate, and often exaggerate architectural details."

Gallery

See also

 Colonial Revival garden
 Dutch Colonial Revival architecture
 Mission Revival Style architecture
 New Classical architecture
 Spanish Colonial Revival architecture
 Wallace Nutting
 Colonial Williamsburg

Further reading
 Alan Axelrod, ed. The Colonial Revival in America. New York: W.W. Norton, 1985.
 William Butler, Another City Upon a Hill: Litchfield, Connecticut, and the Colonial Revival 
 Karal Ann Marling, George Washington Slept Here: Colonial Revivals and American Culture, 1876–1986, 1988.
 Richard Guy Wilson and Noah Sheldon, The Colonial Revival House, 2004.
 Richard Guy Wilson, Shaun Eyring and Kenny Marotta, Re-creating the American Past: Essays on the Colonial Revival, 2006.

Notes

References
Cyril M. Harris, American Architecture: An Illustrated Encyclopedia (W.W. Norton: 1998).
Virginia Savage McAlester, A Field Guide to American Houses: The Definitive Guide to Identifying and Understanding America's Domestic Architecture (Knopf: 2017).

 
 
American architectural styles
Colonial Revival Movement
Georgian architecture
House styles
Revival architectural styles
Revival architecture in the United States